The Highest Science is an original novel written by Gareth Roberts and based on the long-running British science fiction television series Doctor Who. It features the Seventh Doctor and Bernice and the first appearance of the recurring monsters, the Chelonians. A prelude to the novel, also penned by Roberts, appeared in Doctor Who Magazine #196.

The novel was going to be adapted into the 2009 Doctor Who Easter special, making this story, like Human Nature, an early "version" of a canonical television story; the concept was continually altered, however, resulting in "Planet of the Dead". The Chelonians were mentioned onscreen in the episode "The Pandorica Opens" as one of the Doctor's enemy species who have banded together to defeat him, suggesting that the events of the novel (like those of the television-acknowledged novel The Monsters Inside) have in fact happened.

Publisher's Summary
Sakkrat. Many legends speak of this world, home of an ancient empire destroyed by its own greatest achievement: the Highest Science, the pinnacle of technological discovery.

When the TARDIS alerts the Doctor and Bernice to the presence of an enormous temporal fluctuation on a large, green, unremarkable planet, they are not to know of any connection with the legend.

But the connection is there, and it will lead them into conflict with the monstrous Chelonians, with their contempt for human parasites; into adventure with a group of youngsters whose musical taste has suddenly become dangerously significant; and will force them to face Sheldukher, the most wanted criminal in the galaxy.

Chelonians
This novel sees the first appearance of the Chelonians, a race of cybernetic humanoid tortoises who appeared subsequently in other spin-off novels and are referenced in The Pandorica Opens.  The Chelonians are war-like, hermaphroditic and lay eggs. They have cybernetic enhancements that include X-ray vision and improved hearing, but this advanced state of technology often causes them to consider human-beings as a form of parasite to be removed.

Contrary to how they are depicted on the dust jacket art to this book and Zamper, they walk on all fours.

Audio Adaptation
In December 2014 Big Finish Productions released an audio adaptation of the novel.

References

External links
The Highest Science Prelude
The Cloister Library – The Highest Science

1993 British novels
1993 science fiction novels
Virgin New Adventures
Novels by Gareth Roberts (writer)
Seventh Doctor novels